The 1995–96 NBA season was the Bulls' 30th season in the National Basketball Association. During the off-season, the Bulls acquired controversial All-Star forward and rebound-specialist Dennis Rodman from the San Antonio Spurs, and signed free agents Randy Brown and James Edwards. At midseason, the team signed John Salley, who was previously released by the expansion Toronto Raptors; Rodman, Edwards and Salley were all teammates on the Detroit Pistons during the "Bad Boy" era, where they won two straight championships in 1989 and 1990. The Bulls had the best team offensive rating and the best team defensive rating in the NBA.

Widely regarded as the greatest team in NBA history, the 1995–96 Bulls were named one of the Top 10 Teams in NBA History during the celebration of the league's 50th anniversary in 1996. The team set the record for most wins in an NBA regular season in which they won the championship, finishing with 72 wins and 10 losses. The regular season record was broken by the 2015–16 Golden State Warriors, who finished 73–9 but would go on to lose in the 2016 NBA Finals; that Warriors team had a connection to the 1995–96 Bulls team as Steve Kerr, the Golden State coach, was a point guard with the Bulls.

The Bulls' started 37–0 at home, part of a then-NBA-record 44-game winning streak that included games from the 1994–95 regular-season. Their 33 road wins were the most in NBA history until the 2015–16 Warriors won 34 road games. The season was the best 3-loss start in NBA history at 41–3 (.932), which included an 18-game winning streak for the team. The team also went undefeated in January with a 14–0 record, and held a 42–5 record at the All-Star break. The Bulls became the first NBA team to ever win 70 regular season games, finishing first overall in their division, conference, and the entire NBA, and posted a league best 39–2 home record. They are also the only team in NBA history to win more than 70 games and an NBA title in the same season.

Michael Jordan and Scottie Pippen were both selected for the 1996 NBA All-Star Game in San Antonio, with head coach Phil Jackson coaching the Eastern Conference, and with Jordan winning his second All-Star Game MVP award. Jordan was named Most Valuable Player of the Year, averaging 30.4 points, 6.6 rebounds, 4.3 assists and 2.2 steals per game. In addition, Pippen averaged 19.4 points, 6.4 rebounds, 5.9 assists and 1.7 steals per game, while Rodman led the league with 14.9 rebounds per game, but only played 64 games this season, and served a six-game suspension for head butting a referee during a road game against the New Jersey Nets on March 16, 1996, and Croatian small forward Toni Kukoč played a sixth man role, averaging 13.1 points per game off the bench, and was named Sixth Man of the Year. Luc Longley provided the team with 9.1 points and 5.1 rebounds per game, while three-point specialist Steve Kerr contributed 8.4 points per game off the bench, while shooting .515 in three-point field goal percentage, and Ron Harper provided with 7.4 points and 1.3 steals per game. Jordan and Pippen were both named to the All-NBA First Team, and NBA All-Defensive First Team, with Rodman being selected to the latter team, and Jackson was named Coach of the Year. Pippen also finished in fifth place in Most Valuable Player voting, and in second place in Defensive Player of the Year voting.

The Bulls swept the Miami Heat, 3–0 in the Eastern Conference First Round of the playoffs, defeated the 5th-seeded New York Knicks, 4–1 in five games of the Eastern Conference Semi-finals, then swept the Orlando Magic, 4–0 in the Eastern Conference Finals. They then defeated the Seattle SuperSonics, 4–2 in the 1996 NBA Finals, winning their fourth NBA title in six seasons. The Bulls have the best combined regular and postseason record in NBA history at 87–13 (.870). Following the season, Edwards retired and Salley left to play in Greece.

For the season, the Bulls added new black alternate road uniforms with red pinstripes. Eventually, they would remove the pinstripes from their jerseys in 1997.

Off-season
Before the 1995–96 NBA season, the Bulls acquired Dennis Rodman and Jack Haley from the Spurs in exchange for Will Perdue and cash considerations to fill a void at power forward left by Horace Grant, who left the Bulls before the 1994–95 NBA season.

In his book Bad as I Wanna Be, Rodman wrote that Michael Jordan and Scottie Pippen had to approve the trade. Rodman chose the number 91 (9+1=10 according to Rodman for why he chose that number) for his jersey since #10 was retired by the Bulls in 1995 in honor of Bob Love.

Haley played in one game, the final game of the regular season, and didn't participate in the playoffs. He was best known for his friendship with the enigmatic Rodman.

NBA draft

Roster

Standings

Central Division

Eastern Conference

Record vs. opponents

Source: Team Splits on Basketball Reference

Table

Regular season

November

The Bulls began the 1995–96 season on November 3 against the Charlotte Hornets and defeated them, 105–91, with Michael Jordan scoring 42 points. The next day, Chicago defeated the Boston Celtics in a 22-point blowout, 107–85, behind Scottie Pippen's 21 points, 4 rebounds and 5 assists. On November 7, the Bulls defeated the Toronto Raptors behind Jordan's 38 points. In Gund Arena, Chicago defeated the Cleveland Cavaliers on November 9, where Scottie Pippen accumulated a triple-double with 18 points, 13 rebounds, and 12 assists. After defeating the Portland Trail Blazers on November 11, the Bulls reached a 5–0 start for the season. On November 14, Chicago's undefeated streak ended with a loss to the Orlando Magic, despite a double-double performance by Pippen who recorded 17 points and 10 rebounds. Jordan also scored 23 points and grabbed 7 rebounds for the Bulls Following their first loss of the season, Chicago bounced back to defeat Cleveland on November 15. The Bulls would continue their winning ways by defeating the New Jersey Nets on November 17. Toni Kukoc recorded a game-high 19 points and 7 assists for the Bulls.

The Bulls went on a road trip to play against seven Western Conference teams. On November 21, Chicago played in its first overtime game of the season in a win against the Dallas Mavericks, 108–102, backed by a double-double performance by Pippen who recorded 26 points, 12 rebounds and 7 assists and 36 points from Jordan. On the next day, the Bulls defeated the San Antonio Spurs behind another triple-double by Pippen who recorded 15 points, 10 rebounds and 13 assists. and Jordan's 38 points and 9 rebounds. Chicago then went to Delta Center to play against the Utah Jazz on November 24. In the game, the Bulls defeated the Jazz, 90–85. On November 26, the Bulls headed to Seattle and led the Sonics 64-51 after the first half, but the Sonics mounted a comeback outscoring the Bulls on the next two quarters, thus handing the visiting Bulls their second loss of the season, 92–97. Jordan led the Bulls with 22 points and 5 rebounds. The next game, the Bulls would visit the Trailblazers. Jordan led all scorers with 33 points to go along with 8 assists, as the Bulls won, 107–104. In their last game of the month, the Bulls went to Canada to play against the Vancouver Grizzlies and defeated them, 94–88.

December
Chicago's road trip ended in Los Angeles on December 2 after defeating the Clippers behind Jordan's double-double of 37 points and 11 rebounds. On December 6, the Bulls headed back to the United Center to play the New York Knicks and had defeated them despite Jordan's struggle that night who shot just 8-for-27 from the field. In that game also, Rodman grabbed a game-high 20 rebounds. The Bulls won their fifth straight game on December 8 against the Spurs, behind Jordan's statline of 28 points, 5 rebounds and 6 assists. On the next day, Chicago defeated the Milwaukee Bucks behind Jordan's 45-point performance and Pippen's 28 points and 6 assists. On December 13, the Bulls were visited by the Orlando Magic. Jordan recorded 36 points and 6 rebounds, Pippen recorded 26 points, 8 rebounds and 6 assists and Rodman recorded 8 points and 19 rebounds as they got their 17th win of the season, beating the visiting Magic, 112–103. The next day, the Bulls traveled to Atlanta to take on the Hawks on the road. The Bulls outscored the Hawks 65 to 55 in the first half, thus fueling them towards their 8th straight win and 18th win of the season. Pippen led the Bulls having recorded a near triple-double of 30 points, 8 rebounds and 8 assists. On December 16, Pippen recorded a double-double of 33 points and 13 rebounds as the Bulls got the win over the visiting L.A. Lakers, 108–88. Two days after, Jordan and Pippen both scored 37 points as they fueled the Bulls towards their 20th win of the season, after beating the Celtics, 123–114.

January
The Bulls went undefeated in January.

February
The Bulls continued their success in February, winning 11 of 14 of the games played this month. And also, this is their first and only time they have lost back-to-back games for the whole season. On February 4, they had been defeated by the Denver Nuggets despite a stellar performance by Michael Jordan who recorded 39 points and 4 assists on the road. The following game, the Bulls also lost another road game, this time to the Phoenix Suns. In this game, Charles Barkley proved too much to be handle by the Bulls as he dropped a double-double of 35 points and 16 rebounds to guide his team in winning. After losing two straight road games, the Bulls followed it with 7 straight wins. In that 7-game streak, the Bulls defeated the Warriors, Bullets, Pistons (in OT), Timberwolves, Pacers, Cavaliers and Hawks. Their 7-game winning streak were stopped by the home team, the Miami Heat. The Heat, guided by Rex Chapman who shot 9-for-10 from 3-point range, proved too much to be handled by the visiting Bulls. With this loss, the Bulls now have lost 6 games for the whole season, and all 6 of those games are on the road.

March

The Bulls added 2 of their final 10 losses in March:

On Sunday, March 10, they were blown out 104–72 in Madison Square Garden by Ewing's Knicks – their largest margin of defeat on the season.

Two weeks later, they dropped a game at the hands of the expansion Raptors, 109–108. Damon Stoudamire posted an efficient 30-point, 11-assist effort to lead Toronto.

April
The Bulls lost two home games in the final month losing to the Charlotte Hornets, then their final home game of the season to the Indiana Pacers. Those were their only home losses of the entire season, including the playoffs, as Chicago finished with an overall 39–2 record at the United Center.

Playoffs

First round

The Bulls' playoff run began on April 26. Their First Round opponent was the Miami Heat, whom they defeated 3–1 in the regular season. In Game 1, the Bulls defeated Miami in a blowout victory behind Jordan's 35 points. Winning in a 31-point blowout, Chicago once again defeated the Heat. To reach the Conference Semifinals, the Bulls defeated the Heat in Miami in a game where Pippen accumulated a triple-double with 22 points, 18 rebounds, and 10 assists.

Conference semifinals

The Bulls met rival New York Knicks in the Conference Semifinals. In the regular season, Chicago won the season series, 4–1. In Game 1 on May 5, the Bulls defeated the Knicks behind Jordan's 44 points. Chicago would defeat New York again on May 7 to take a 2–0 series lead. Playing at Madison Square Garden, the Bulls lost Game 3 in overtime, despite a 46-point offensive performance by Jordan. In Game 4, Chicago defeated the Knicks by three points to take a 3–1 series lead. To close out the series, the Bulls defeated New York at home behind double-double performances by Pippen and Rodman.

Conference finals

In the Conference Finals, the Bulls met the Atlantic Division champions, Orlando Magic, a team led by Shaquille O'Neal and Penny Hardaway, who had reached the finals the previous year and were swept by Hakeem Olajuwon and the Houston Rockets. The Bulls won the regular-season series against the Magic, 3–1. To start the series, the Bulls took Game 1 in a 38-point blowout on May 19. Behind Jordan's 35 points, Chicago defeated Orlando on May 21. In Game 3, the Bulls continued their winning ways by taking a 3–0 series lead against the Magic. Completing the series sweep, the Bulls won Game 4 by five points behind a 45-point performance by Jordan.

NBA Finals

Chicago took on the Seattle SuperSonics, whose 64–18 franchise-best regular season record was overshadowed by the Bulls' 72–10 record. In the regular season, the two teams split the season series, 1–1. In Game 1 of the NBA Finals, Chicago defeated Seattle by 17 points. The Bulls took a 2–0 series lead against the Sonics in the second game where Rodman accumulated 20 rebounds. In KeyArena, Chicago won Game 3 behind Jordan's 36 points. The Bulls lost Game 4 in a 21-point blowout on June 12. On June 14, the Bulls lost against Seattle in Game 5. Back in the United Center, Chicago defeated Seattle in Game 6 to win the NBA championship four games to two.

Game log

Regular season

|- bgcolor="#bbffbb"
| 1
| November 3
| Charlotte
| W 105–91
| Michael Jordan (42)
| Dennis Rodman (11)
| Michael Jordan (7)
| United Center23,862
| 1–0
|- bgcolor="#bbffbb"
| 2
| November 4
| Boston
| W 107–85
| Scottie Pippen (21)
| Longley & Rodman (8)
| Kukoč & Pippen (5)
| United Center23,608
| 2–0
|- bgcolor="#bbffbb"
| 3
| November 7
| Toronto
| W 117–108
| Michael Jordan (38)
| Dennis Rodman (13)
| Scottie Pippen (8)
| United Center23,102
| 3–0
|- bgcolor="#bbffbb"
| 4
| November 9
| @ Cleveland
| W 106–88
| Michael Jordan (29)
| Scottie Pippen (13)
| Scottie Pippen (12)
| Gund Arena20,562
| 4–0
|- bgcolor="#bbffbb"
| 5
| November 11
| Portland
| W 110–106
| Michael Jordan (36)
| Scottie Pippen (9)
| Michael Jordan (7)
| United Center23,384
| 5–0
|- bgcolor="#ffcccc"
| 6
| November 14
| @ Orlando
| L 88–94
| Michael Jordan (23)
| Scottie Pippen (10)
| Jordan & Pippen (6)
| Orlando Arena17,248
| 5–1
|- bgcolor="#bbffbb"
| 7
| November 15
| Cleveland
| W 113–94
| Scottie Pippen (27)
| Jason Caffey (8)
| Scottie Pippen (8)
| United Center23,257
| 6–1
|- bgcolor="#bbffbb"
| 8
| November 17
| New Jersey
| W 109–94
| Toni Kukoč (19)
| Luc Longley (8)
| Toni Kukoč (7)
| United Center23,312
| 7–1
|- bgcolor="#bbffbb"
| 9
| November 21
| @ Dallas
| W 108–102 (OT)
| Michael Jordan (36)
| Scottie Pippen (12)
| Scottie Pippen (7)
| Reunion Arena17,502
| 8–1
|- bgcolor="#bbffbb"
| 10
| November 22
| @ San Antonio
| W 103–94
| Michael Jordan (38)
| Luc Longley (11)
| Scottie Pippen (13)
| Alamodome35,888
| 9–1
|- bgcolor="#bbffbb"
| 11
| November 24
| @ Utah
| W 90–85
| Michael Jordan (34)
| Luc Longley (10)
| Michael Jordan (6)
| Delta Center19,911
| 10–1
|- bgcolor="#ffcccc"
| 12
| November 26
| @ Seattle
| L 92–97
| Michael Jordan (22)
| Scottie Pippen (12)
| Scottie Pippen (5)
| KeyArena17,072
| 10–2
|- bgcolor="#bbffbb"
| 13
| November 27
| @ Portland
| W 107–104
| Michael Jordan (33)
| Pippen & Wennington (5)
| Scottie Pippen (10)
| Rose Garden21,401
| 11–2
|- bgcolor="#bbffbb"
| 14
| November 30
| @ Vancouver
| W 94–88
| Michael Jordan (29)
| Luc Longley (10)
| Scottie Pippen (8)
| General Motors Place19,193
| 12–2
|-

|- bgcolor="#bbffbb"
| 15
| December 2
| @ L.A. Clippers
| W 104–98
| Michael Jordan (37)
| Scottie Pippen (13)
| Scottie Pippen (6)
| Arrowhead Pond18,321
| 13–2
|- bgcolor="#bbffbb"
| 16
| December 6
| New York
| W 101–94
| Jordan & Pippen (22)
| Dennis Rodman (20)
| Jordan & Pippen (8)
| United Center23,828
| 14–2
|- bgcolor="#bbffbb"
| 17
| December 8
| San Antonio
| W 106–87
| Michael Jordan (28)
| Dennis Rodman (21)
| Michael Jordan (6)
| United Center23,802
| 15–2
|- bgcolor="#bbffbb"
| 18
| December 9
| @ Milwaukee
| W 118–106
| Michael Jordan (45)
| Dennis Rodman (21)
| Scottie Pippen (6)
| Bradley Center18,633
| 16–2
|- bgcolor="#bbffbb"
| 19
| December 13
| Orlando
| W 112–103
| Michael Jordan (36)
| Dennis Rodman (19)
| Scottie Pippen (6)
| United Center23,895
| 17–2
|- bgcolor="#bbffbb"
| 20
| December 14
| @ Atlanta
| W 127–108
| Scottie Pippen (30)
| Dennis Rodman (10)
| Kukoč & Pippen (8)
| Omni Coliseum16,378
| 18–2
|- bgcolor="#bbffbb"
| 21
| December 16
| L.A. Lakers
| W 108–88
| Scottie Pippen (33)
| Dennis Rodman (15)
| Jordan & Pippen (6)
| United Center23,824
| 19–2
|- bgcolor="#bbffbb"
| 22
| December 18
| @ Boston
| W 123–114
| Jordan & Pippen (37)
| Dennis Rodman (17)
| Scottie Pippen (12)
| FleetCenter18,624
| 20–2
|- bgcolor="#bbffbb"
| 23
| December 19
| Dallas
| W 114–101
| Michael Jordan (32)
| Dennis Rodman (13)
| Steve Kerr (6)
| United Center23,208
| 21–2
|- bgcolor="#bbffbb"
| 24
| December 22
| Toronto
| W 113–104
| Michael Jordan (27)
| Michael Jordan (10)
| Michael Jordan (5)
| United Center22,987
| 22–2
|- bgcolor="#bbffbb"
| 25
| December 23
| Utah
| W 100–86
| Michael Jordan (30)
| Dennis Rodman (12)
| Michael Jordan (8)
| United Center23,906
| 23–2
|- bgcolor="#ffcccc"
| 26
| December 26
| @ Indiana
| L 97–103
| Michael Jordan (30)
| Dennis Rodman (11)
| Scottie Pippen (6)
| Market Square Arena16,728
| 23–3
|- bgcolor="#bbffbb"
| 27
| December 29
| Indiana
| W 120–93
| Michael Jordan (29)
| Dennis Rodman (16)
| Scottie Pippen (8)
| United Center23,739
| 24–3
|- bgcolor="#bbffbb"
| 28
| December 30
| Atlanta
| W 95–93
| Michael Jordan (33)
| Dennis Rodman (21)
| Michael Jordan (6)
| United Center23,587
| 25–3
|-

|- bgcolor="#bbffbb"
| 29
| January 3
| Houston
| W 100–86
| Michael Jordan (38)
| Dennis Rodman (15)
| Scottie Pippen (9)
| United Center23,854
| 26–3
|- bgcolor="#bbffbb"
| 30
| January 4
| @ Charlotte
| W 117–93
| Michael Jordan (27)
| Dennis Rodman (11)
| Ron Harper (7)
| Charlotte Coliseum24,042
| 27–3
|- bgcolor="#bbffbb"
| 31
| January 6
| Milwaukee
| W 113–84
| Michael Jordan (32)
| Dennis Rodman (16)
| Scottie Pippen (6)
| United Center23,801
| 28–3
|- bgcolor="#bbffbb"
| 32
| January 10
| Seattle
| W 113–87
| Michael Jordan (35)
| Michael Jordan (14)
| 3 players tied (5)
| United Center23,877
| 29–3
|- bgcolor="#bbffbb"
| 33
| January 13
| @ Philadelphia
| W 120–93
| Michael Jordan (48)
| Dennis Rodman (16)
| Scottie Pippen (10)
|  CoreStates Spectrum18,168
| 30–3
|- bgcolor="#bbffbb"
| 34
| January 15
| @ Washington
| W 116–109
| Michael Jordan (46)
| Dennis Rodman (15)
| Scottie Pippen (6)
| USAir Arena18,756
| 31–3
|- bgcolor="#bbffbb"
| 35
| January 16
| Philadelphia
| W 116–104
| Michael Jordan (32)
| Dennis Rodman (21)
| Dennis Rodman (10)
| United Center23,587
| 32–3
|- bgcolor="#bbffbb"
| 36
| January 18
| @ Toronto
| W 92–89
| Michael Jordan (38)
| Dennis Rodman (13)
| Pippen & Rodman (4)
| SkyDome36,118
| 33–3
|- bgcolor="#bbffbb"
| 37
| January 21
| @ Detroit
| W 111–96
| Michael Jordan (36)
| Dennis Rodman (9)
| Scottie Pippen (6)
| The Palace of Auburn Hills21,454
| 34–3
|- bgcolor="#bbffbb"
| 38
| January 23
| @ New York
| W 99–79
| Michael Jordan (33)
| Dennis Rodman (13)
| Scottie Pippen (6)
| Madison Square Garden19,763
| 35–3
|- bgcolor="#bbffbb"
| 39
| January 24
| Vancouver
| W 104–84
| Scottie Pippen (30)
| Dennis Rodman (16)
| Ron Harper (7)
| United Center23,652
| 36–3
|- bgcolor="#bbffbb"
| 40
| January 26
| Miami
| W 102–80
| Michael Jordan (25)
| Dennis Rodman (16)
| Pippen & Rodman (5)
| United Center23,814
| 37–3
|- bgcolor="#bbffbb"
| 41
| January 28
| Phoenix
| W 93–82
| Michael Jordan (31)
| Dennis Rodman (20)
| Michael Jordan (6)
| United Center23,927
| 38–3
|- bgcolor="#bbffbb"
| 42
| January 30
| @ Houston
| W 98–87
| Scottie Pippen (28)
| Scottie Pippen (12)
| Scottie Pippen (5)
| The Summit16,286
| 39–3
|-

|- bgcolor="#bbffbb"
| 43
| February 1
| @ Sacramento
| W 105–85
| Michael Jordan (27)
| Dennis Rodman (21)
| Toni Kukoč (5)
| ARCO Arena17,317
| 40–3
|- bgcolor="#bbffbb"
| 44
| February 2
| @ L.A. Lakers
| W 99–84
| Scottie Pippen (30)
| Dennis Rodman (23)
| Michael Jordan (7)
| Great Western Forum17,505
| 41–3
|- bgcolor="#ffcccc"
| 45
| February 4
| @ Denver
| L 99–105
| Michael Jordan (39)
| Dennis Rodman (12)
| 3 players tied (5)
| McNichols Sports Arena17,171
| 41–4
|- bgcolor="#ffcccc"
| 46
| February 6
| @ Phoenix
| L 96–106
| Michael Jordan (28)
| Dennis Rodman (14)
| Scottie Pippen (8)
| America West Arena19,023
| 41–5
|- bgcolor="#bbffbb"
| 47
| February 7
| @ Golden State
| W 99–95
| Michael Jordan (40)
| Dennis Rodman (18)
| Michael Jordan (6)
| Oakland Coliseum Arena15,025
| 42–5
|- align="center"
|colspan="9" bgcolor="#bbcaff"|All-Star Break
|- style="background:#cfc;"
|- bgcolor="#bbffbb"
| 48
| February 13
| Washington
| W 111–98
| Michael Jordan (32)
| Dennis Rodman (16)
| Scottie Pippen (4)
| United Center23,494
| 43–5
|- bgcolor="#bbffbb"
| 49
| February 15
| @ Detroit
| W 112–109 (OT)
| Michael Jordan (32)
| Dennis Rodman (19)
| Scottie Pippen (6)
| The Palace of Auburn Hills21,454
| 44–5
|- bgcolor="#bbffbb"
| 50
| February 16
| @ Minnesota
| W 103–100
| Michael Jordan (35)
| Dennis Rodman (19)
| Scottie Pippen (7)
| Target Center20,214
| 45–5
|- bgcolor="#bbffbb"
| 51
| February 18
| @ Indiana
| W 110–102
| Michael Jordan (44)
| Dennis Rodman (23)
| Michael Jordan (7)
| Market Square Arena16,770
| 46–5
|- bgcolor="#bbffbb"
| 52
| February 20
| Cleveland
| W 102–76
| Ron Harper (22)
| Dennis Rodman (15)
| Scottie Pippen (8)
| United Center23,604
| 47–5
|- bgcolor="#bbffbb"
| 53
| February 22
| @ Atlanta
| W 96–91
| Michael Jordan (34)
| Dennis Rodman (20)
| Scottie Pippen (10)
| Omni Coliseum16,378
| 48–5
|- bgcolor="#ffcccc"
| 54
| February 23
| @ Miami
| L 104–113
| Michael Jordan (31)
| Dennis Rodman (11)
| Scottie Pippen (6)
| Miami Arena15,200
| 48–6
|- bgcolor="#bbffbb"
| 55
| February 25
| Orlando
| W 111–91
| Toni Kukoč (24)
| Dennis Rodman (17)
| Michael Jordan (7)
| United Center24,102
| 49–6
|- bgcolor="#bbffbb"
| 56
| February 27
| Minnesota
| W 120–99
| Michael Jordan (35)
| Dennis Rodman (24)
| Michael Jordan (7)
| United Center23,716
| 50–6
|-

|- bgcolor="#bbffbb"
| 57
| March 1
| Golden State
| W 110–87
| Scottie Pippen (25)
| Dennis Rodman (17)
| Michael Jordan (6)
| United Center23,596
| 51–6
|- bgcolor="#bbffbb"
| 58
| March 2
| Boston
| W 107–75
| Michael Jordan (21)
| Dennis Rodman (15)
| Michael Jordan (8)
| United Center23,721
| 52–6
|- bgcolor="#bbffbb"
| 59
| March 5
| Milwaukee
| W 115–106
| Michael Jordan (33)
| Dennis Rodman (9)
| Harper & Kukoč (7)
| United Center23,547
| 53–6
|- bgcolor="#bbffbb"
| 60
| March 7
| Detroit
| W 102–81
| Michael Jordan (53)
| Dennis Rodman (13)
| Scottie Pippen (10)
| United Center23,369
| 54–6
|- bgcolor="#ffcccc"
| 61
| March 10
| @ New York
| L 72–104
| Michael Jordan (32)
| Dennis Rodman (10)
| Scottie Pippen (5)
| Madison Square Garden19,763
| 54–7
|- bgcolor="#bbffbb"
| 62
| March 13
| Washington
| W 103–86
| Michael Jordan (37)
| Dennis Rodman (14)
| Michael Jordan (5)
| United Center23,652
| 55–7
|- bgcolor="#bbffbb"
| 63
| March 15
| Denver
| W 108–87
| Michael Jordan (33)
| Dennis Rodman (15)
| Toni Kukoč (10)
| United Center23,692
| 56–7
|- bgcolor="#bbffbb"
| 64
| March 16
| @ New Jersey
| W 97–93
| Michael Jordan (37)
| Michael Jordan (16)
| Michael Jordan (5)
| Continental Airlines Arena20,049
| 57–7
|- bgcolor="#bbffbb"
| 65
| March 18
| @ Philadelphia
| W 98–94
| Michael Jordan (38)
| Michael Jordan (11)
| Toni Kukoč (11)
| CoreStates Spectrum18,168
| 58–7
|- bgcolor="#bbffbb"
| 66
| March 19
| Sacramento
| W 89–67
| Michael Jordan (20)
| Michael Jordan (9)
| Toni Kukoč (7)
| United Center23,312
| 59–7
|- bgcolor="#bbffbb"
| 67
| March 21
| New York
| W 107–86
| Michael Jordan (36)
| Michael Jordan (11)
| Jordan & Kukoč (5)
| United Center23,802
| 60–7
|- bgcolor="#ffcccc"
| 68
| March 24
| @ Toronto
| L 108–109
| Michael Jordan (36)
| 3 player tied (9)
| Scottie Pippen (6)
| SkyDome36,131
| 60–8
|- bgcolor="#bbffbb"
| 69
| March 28
| Atlanta
| W 111–80
| Toni Kukoč (24)
| Scottie Pippen (11)
| Scottie Pippen (8)
| United Center23,642
| 61–8
|- bgcolor="#bbffbb"
| 70
| March 30
| L.A. Clippers
| W 106–85
| Scottie Pippen (22)
| Jordan & Kukoč (9)
| Michael Jordan (6)
| United Center23,764
| 62–8
|-

|- bgcolor="#bbffbb"
| 71
| April 2
| @ Miami
| W 110–92
| Jordan & Pippen (32)
| Dennis Rodman (13)
| Ron Harper (6)
| Miami Arena15,200
| 63–8
|- bgcolor="#bbffbb"
| 72
| April 4
| Miami
| W 100–92
| Michael Jordan (40)
| Dennis Rodman (12)
| Scottie Pippen (8)
| United Center23,702
| 64–8
|- bgcolor="#bbffbb"
| 73
| April 5
| @ Charlotte
| W 126–92
| Scottie Pippen (28)
| Dennis Rodman (17)
| Scottie Pippen (14)
| Charlotte Coliseum24,042
| 65–8
|- bgcolor="#bbffbb"
| 74
| April 7
| @ Orlando
| W 90–86
| Michael Jordan (27)
| Pippen & Rodman (13)
| Scottie Pippen (5)
| Orlando Arena17,248
| 66–8
|- bgcolor="#ffcccc"
| 75
| April 8
| Charlotte
| L 97–98
| Michael Jordan (40)
| Dennis Rodman (17)
| Scottie Pippen (6)
| United Center23,590
| 66–9
|- bgcolor="#bbffbb"
| 76
| April 11
| @ New Jersey
| W 113–100
| Michael Jordan (17)
| Dennis Rodman (12)
| Toni Kukoč (6)
| Continental Airlines Arena20,049
| 67–9
|- bgcolor="#bbffbb"
| 77
| April 12
| Philadelphia
| W 112–82
| Michael Jordan (23)
| Dennis Rodman (16)
| Scottie Pippen (6)
| United Center23,633
| 68–9
|- bgcolor="#bbffbb"
| 78
| April 14
| @ Cleveland
| W 98–72
| Michael Jordan (32)
| Michael Jordan (12)
| Toni Kukoč (5)
| Gund Arena20,562
| 69–9
|- bgcolor="#bbffbb"
| 79
| April 16
| @ Milwaukee
| W 86–80
| Michael Jordan (22)
| Dennis Rodman (19)
| 3 players tied (4)
| Bradley Center18,633
| 70–9
|- bgcolor="#bbffbb"
| 80
| April 18
| Detroit
| W 110–79
| Michael Jordan (30)
| Dennis Rodman (18)
| Scottie Pippen (8)
| United Center23,614
| 71–9
|- bgcolor="#ffcccc"
| 81
| April 20
| Indiana
| L 99–100
| Michael Jordan (24)
| Dennis Rodman (15)
| Brown & Jordan (6)
| United Center23,784
| 71–10
|- bgcolor="#bbffbb"
| 82
| April 21
| @ Washington
| W 103–93
| Michael Jordan (26)
| Dennis Rodman (11)
| Scottie Pippen (5)
| USAir Arena18,756
| 72–10

Playoffs

|- align="center" bgcolor="#ccffcc"
| 1
| April 26
| Miami
| 
| Michael Jordan (35)
| Dennis Rodman (10)
| 3 players tied (3)
| United Center24,104
| 1–0
|- align="center" bgcolor="#ccffcc"
| 2
| April 28
| Miami
| 
| Michael Jordan (29)
| Scottie Pippen (8)
| Scottie Pippen (8)
| United Center24,202
| 2–0
|- align="center" bgcolor="#ccffcc"
| 3
| May 1
| @ Miami
| 
| Michael Jordan (26)
| Scottie Pippen (18)
| Scottie Pippen (10)
| Miami Arena15,200
| 3–0

|- align="center" bgcolor="#ccffcc"
| 1
| May 5
| New York
| 
| Michael Jordan (44)
| Dennis Rodman (12)
| Scottie Pippen (7)
| United Center24,394
| 1–0
|- align="center" bgcolor="#ccffcc"
| 2
| May 7
| New York
| 
| Michael Jordan (28)
| Dennis Rodman (19)
| Scottie Pippen (6)
| United Center24,328
| 2–0
|- align="center" bgcolor="#ffcccc"
| 3
| May 11
| @ New York
| 
| Michael Jordan (46)
| Dennis Rodman (16)
| Scottie Pippen (6)
| Madison Square Garden19,763
| 2–1
|- align="center" bgcolor="#ccffcc"
| 4
| May 12
| @ New York
| 
| Michael Jordan (27)
| Dennis Rodman (19)
| Michael Jordan (8)
| Madison Square Garden19,763
| 3–1
|- align="center" bgcolor="#ccffcc"
| 5
| May 14
| New York
| 
| Michael Jordan (35)
| Dennis Rodman (12)
| Harper & Jordan (5)
| United Center24,396
| 4–1

|- align="center" bgcolor="#ccffcc"
| 1
| May 19
| Orlando
| 
| Michael Jordan (21)
| Dennis Rodman (21)
| Toni Kukoč (10)
| United Center24,411
| 1–0
|- align="center" bgcolor="#ccffcc"
| 2
| May 21
| Orlando
| 
| Michael Jordan (35)
| Dennis Rodman (12)
| Scottie Pippen (9)
| United Center24,395
| 2–0
|- align="center" bgcolor="#ccffcc"
| 3
| May 25
| @ Orlando
| 
| Michael Jordan (35)
| Dennis Rodman (12)
| Scottie Pippen (9)
| Orlando Arena17,248
| 3–0
|- align="center" bgcolor="#ccffcc"
| 4
| May 27
| @ Orlando
| 
| Michael Jordan (45)
| Dennis Rodman (14)
| Scottie Pippen (8)
| Orlando Arena17,248
| 4–0

|- align="center" bgcolor="#ccffcc"
| 1
| June 5
| Seattle
| 
| Michael Jordan (28)
| Dennis Rodman (13)
| Ron Harper (7)
| United Center24,544
| 1–0
|- align="center" bgcolor="#ccffcc"
| 2
| June 7
| Seattle
| 
| Michael Jordan (29)
| Dennis Rodman (20)
| Michael Jordan (8)
| United Center24,544
| 2–0
|- align="center" bgcolor="#ccffcc"
| 3
| June 9
| @ Seattle
| 
| Michael Jordan (36)
| Dennis Rodman (10)
| Scottie Pippen (9)
| KeyArena17,072
| 3–0
|- align="center" bgcolor="#ffcccc"
| 4
| June 12
| @ Seattle
| 
| Michael Jordan (23)
| Dennis Rodman (14)
| Scottie Pippen (8)
| KeyArena17,072
| 3–1
|- align="center" bgcolor="#ffcccc"
| 5
| June 14
| @ Seattle
| 
| Michael Jordan (26)
| Dennis Rodman (12)
| Scottie Pippen (5)
| KeyArena17,072
| 3–2
|- align="center" bgcolor="#ccffcc"
| 6
| June 16
| Seattle
| 
| Michael Jordan (22)
| Dennis Rodman (19)
| Michael Jordan (7)
| United Center24,544
| 4–2

Player statistics

Playoff leaders 
Rate statistic requirements

Salaries

Award winners
 Phil Jackson, NBA Coach of the Year
 Michael Jordan, All-NBA First Team
 Michael Jordan, All-Star Game MVP
 Michael Jordan, NBA MVP
 Michael Jordan, NBA Finals MVP
 Michael Jordan, NBA All-Defensive First Team
 Michael Jordan, Regular season leader, Field Goals (916)
 Michael Jordan, Regular season leader, Field Goal Attempts (1850)
 Michael Jordan, Regular season leader, Total Points (2491)
 Michael Jordan, Regular season leader, Scoring Average (30.4 points per game)
 Scottie Pippen, All-NBA First Team
 Scottie Pippen, NBA All-Defensive First Team
 Dennis Rodman, NBA All-Defensive First Team
 Dennis Rodman, Regular season leader, Rebounds Per Game (14.9)
 Dennis Rodman, Regular season leader, Offensive Rebounds (356)
 Dennis Rodman, Regular season leader, Rebound Rate (26.6)
 Toni Kukoč, NBA Sixth Man of the Year
 Jerry Krause, NBA Executive of the Year Award

NBA All-Star Game
 Michael Jordan, Guard
 Scottie Pippen, Forward

References

External links
 Bulls on Database Basketball
 Bulls on Basketball Reference
 

Chicago Bulls seasons
Eastern Conference (NBA) championship seasons
NBA championship seasons
Chic
Chicago
Chicago